Richard Manning White  (1930 – August 17, 2020) was an electrical engineer and a professor emeritus in the Department of Electrical Engineering and Computer Sciences  at UC Berkeley and a Co-Founding Director of the Berkeley Sensor & Actuator Center (BSAC). He and Richard S. Muller founded the BSAC in 1986. They received 2013 IEEE/RSE James Clerk Maxwell Medal for pioneering innovation and leadership in MEMS technology. Professor White is known for inventing the Interdigital Transducer (IDT) and for his surface acoustic wave work, he received the 2003 Rayleigh Award. He received the IEEE Cledo Brunetti Award in 1986.

He was born in 1930 and grew up in Denver. He researched microwave devices at General Electric while at Harvard before he obtained a Ph.D. from the college. Professor White was IEEE's Fellow and a member of the National Academy of Engineering and a Fellow of the American Association for the Advancement of Science.

Professor White was still active in his field when he died on August 17, 2020.

References 

Harvard University alumni
American electrical engineers
UC Berkeley College of Engineering faculty
Fellow Members of the IEEE
IEEE award recipients
Fellows of the American Association for the Advancement of Science
2020 deaths
1930 births
People from Denver